Melike Öztürk (born 1 April 2001) is a Turkish women's football forward, who plays in the First League for Beşiktaş with jersey number 14. She was a member of the  girls' national U-17 and women's U-19 teams before she was admitted to the Turkey women's team.

Private life
Melike Öztürk was born in Gelibolu district of Çanakkale Province, Turkey on 1 April 2001.

Playing career

Club

Öztürk received her license for Denizli Pamukkale Üniversitesi Gençlikspor on 13 November 2015. She capped in 12 matches for the Denizli-based university team in the 2015–16 Turkish Women's Third League season, and netted 24 goals. The next season, she moved to Aydın to join İncirliova Belediyespor. After scoring 67 goals in 26 games, she transferred to Horozkent Spor in Denizli in the second half of the 2017–18 Women's Third League season. After scoring 16 goals in seven matches for Horozkent, Öztürk returned to her former club İncirliova Belediyespor for the 2018–19 Third League season, where she netted 13 goals in eight games.

By early August 2019, Öztürk signed with the Istanbul-based Ataşehir Belediyespor to play in the Women's First League. She scored five goals in 15 matches of the 2019-20 season, which was discontinued due to the outbreak of COVID-19 pandemic in Turkey.
In the 2021 Turkcel League season, she transferred to Beşiktaş J.K., and enjoyed her team's champions title.  She played in two matches of the 2021–22 UEFA Women's Champions League qualifying rounds.

International
Turkey girls' U-17
Öztürk was admitted to the Turkey girls' U-17 team debuting in the match against Portugal in the UEFA Development Tournament on 13 May 2016. She appeared in 2017 UEFA Women's U-17 Championship qualification - Group 7, 2018 UEFA Women's U-17 Championship qualification - Group 7 and Elite round Group 6 matches. She capped in a total of 25 matches and scored 13 goals for the Turkey girls' U-17 team.

Turkey women's U-19 
She was called up to the Turkey women's U-19 team for the friendly match against Poland on 28 August 2018. 
She took part at the 2019 UEFA Women's U-19 Championship qualification - Group 2 and Elite round Group 6 as well as 2020 UEFA Women's U-19 Championship qualification - Group 12 matches. She played in 14 games and scored two goals total.

Turkey women's
Öztürk was first named for the Turkey women's team in the beginning of Deceöber 2019. In the away match against Slovenia in the UEFA Women's Euro 2021 qualifying Group A, she sat on the bench. She played in the same tournament's home match against Kosovo on 23 October 2020.

Career statistics
.

Honours
Turkish Women's First League
Beşiktaş J.K.
 Winners (1): 2020–21

References

Living people
2001 births
People from Gelibolu
Turkish women's footballers
Women's association football forwards
Turkey women's international footballers
Ataşehir Belediyespor players
Beşiktaş J.K. women's football players
Turkish Women's Football Super League players
21st-century Turkish sportswomen